South Weymouth may refer to:
 South Weymouth (MBTA station) in Weymouth, Massachusetts 
 Naval Air Station South Weymouth, an airfield near Weymouth, Massachusetts